Noel Hartnett (1909–1960) was an Irish politician, barrister, broadcaster and writer. He was a Clann na Poblachta member of Seanad Éireann from 1951 to 1954.

Until the 1940s, Hartnett was Junior Counsel to former IRA Chief of Staff Seán MacBride in a number of defences of IRA prisoners. In 1946, the pair represented the deceased hunger-striker Seán McCaughey at an inquest into his death, which embarrassed the government of Éamon de Valera by exposing the poor conditions at Portlaoise Prison.
Hartnett - whose family were all supporters of de Valera and the Fianna Fáil party he founded - was then dismissed from his position at Radio Éireann, the Irish broadcasting company, under the influence of de Valera. Hartnett left Fianna Faíl soon after and joined Clann na Poblachta, the new political party founded by MacBride.

In 1947, MacBride became a Teachta Dála (TD) for Dublin County in the 1947 by-election. De Valera then sought to outwit his opponents with a snap election in 1948. Because of his political experience, MacBride chose Hartnett as his director of elections. He narrated and appeared in Ireland's first political campaigning film, for Clann na Poblachta, called "Our Country".
After the new party won ten seats, it formed part of the first Inter-Party Government, ousting Fianna Fáil from their long tenure as the party of government. Hartnett had failed to win the seat for the Dún Laoghaire and Rathdown constituency, though there remained the possibility of appointment to the Seanad Éireann. However, he was bitterly hurt to be overlooked by Seán MacBride to be party spokesman in the Seanad. After a bill to fund a new Irish News Agency (with an anti-partition slant) was passed in 1949, MacBride's initial choice for head of the Agency was Hartnett but after a row with him he asked Conor Cruise O'Brien instead, a man who referred to  Hartnett as "a dedicated republican propagandist." Hartnett ended up on the board of the Agency. MacBride also took Hartnett with him as a speech-writer on a trip to the USA, to pen the rousing, sentimental, republican message for the local audience; Hartnett was sent home half-way through, initially explaining that MacBride considered the words of his speech too aggressive. Eventually, because of MacBride's failure to act regarding a case of political cronyism concerning James Everett, Minister for Posts and Telegraphs in the Baltinglass affair, he provided a resignation letter for MacBride in February 1951.

In the subsequent election of 1951 he was Noël Browne's director of elections - with Browne running as an independent -  and he threatened legal action against some clerics of the Catholic Church who had cast Browne, in his support of free healthcare, either as communist or Nazi.

It was arranged that same year for Hartnett to see a consultant cardiologist because of his ill health, and he was given a poor prognosis. Notwithstanding this, he continued in politics and was elected by the Labour Panel to the 7th Seanad, representing Clann na Poblachta.
He lost his seat at the 1954 Seanad election. In June 1958, he failed in his second attempt to become a TD, this time representing the National Progressive Democrats in the Dublin South-Central constituency by-election.

References

1909 births
1960 deaths
Clann na Poblachta senators
Members of the 7th Seanad
National Progressive Democrats politicians